Poland competed at the 2016 Summer Olympics in Rio de Janeiro, Brazil, from 5 to 21 August 2016. Since the nation's official debut in 1924, Polish athletes have appeared in every edition of the Summer Olympic Games except the 1984 Summer Olympics in Los Angeles, because of the Soviet boycott.

Medalists

|  style="text-align:left; width:78%; vertical-align:top;"|

|  style="text-align:left; width:22%; vertical-align:top;"|

Competitors

| width=78% align=left valign=top |
The following is the list of number of competitors participating in the Games. Note that reserves in fencing and handball are not counted as athletes.

Archery

One Polish archer qualified for the women's individual recurve by obtaining one of the eight Olympic places available from the 2015 World Archery Championships in Copenhagen, Denmark.

Athletics

Polish athletes have so far achieved qualifying standards in the following athletics events (up to a maximum of 3 athletes in each event):

On May 6, 2016, the Polish Olympic Committee had selected the first batch of track and field athletes for the Games, featuring double Worlds champion and London 2012 Olympian Paweł Fajdek (hammer throw) and Beijing 2008 silver medalist Piotr Małachowski (discus throw).

Track & road events
Men

Women

Field events
Men

Women

Combined events – Men's decathlon

Badminton

Poland has qualified five badminton players for each of the following events into the Olympic tournament. Adrian Dziółko was selected among the top 34 individual shuttlers in the men's singles, while the men's (Cwalina & Wacha) and mixed doubles (Mateusiak & Zięba) had claimed their Olympic spots each with a top 16 finish in the BWF World Rankings as of 5 May 2016.

Boxing

Poland has entered two boxers to compete in each of the following weight classes into the Olympic boxing tournament. Tomasz Jabłoński was the only Polish boxer to be selected to the Olympic team with a top two finish of his respective division in the World Series of Boxing. Meanwhile, world no. 1 seed Igor Jakubowski had claimed an Olympic place as the winner and sole recipient of the men's heavyweight division at the 2016 AIBA World Qualifying Tournament in Baku.

Canoeing

Slalom
Polish canoeists have qualified a maximum of one boat in each of the following classes through the 2015 ICF Canoe Slalom World Championships. The slalom canoeing team was named to the Polish roster at the conclusion of the 2016 European Canoe Slalom Championships on May 18, 2016.

Sprint
Polish canoeists have qualified one boat in each of the following events through the 2015 ICF Canoe Sprint World Championships.

Men

Women

Qualification Legend: FA = Qualify to final A (medal); FB = Qualify to final B (non-medal)

Cycling

Road
Polish riders qualified for the following quota places in the men's and women's Olympic road race by virtue of their top 15 national finish in the 2015 UCI World Tour (for men) and top 22 in the 2016 UCI World Ranking (for women).

Men

Women

Track
Following the completion of the 2016 UCI Track Cycling World Championships, Polish riders have accumulated spots in the men's team sprint, the women's team pursuit, and the women's omnium. As a result of their place in the men's team sprint, Poland has won the right to enter two riders in both the men's sprint and keirin.

The full track cycling team was named to the Polish roster for the Games on July 7, 2016, with Damian Zieliński leading the nation's riders on the velodrome at his third Olympics.

Sprint

Team sprint

Pursuit

Keirin

Omnium

Mountain biking
Polish mountain bikers qualified for two women's quota places into the Olympic cross-country race, as a result of the nation's seventh-place finish in the UCI Olympic Ranking List of May 25, 2016. First-time Olympian Katarzyna Solus-Miśkowicz and Beijing 2008 runner-up Maja Włoszczowska were named to the Polish mountain biking team for the Games on May 30, 2016.

Equestrian

Poland has received a spare berth freed up by Switzerland to send an eventing rider to the Games, as the next highest-ranked eligible athlete, not yet qualified, outside the group selection in the individual FEI Olympic Rankings.

Eventing

Fencing

Polish fencers have qualified a full squad in the women's team sabre by picking up the spare berth freed up by Africa for being the next highest ranking nation in the FIE Olympic Team Rankings. Hanna Łyczbińska secured a spot on the Polish team in the women's foil by virtue of a top two placement from Europe outside the world's top 14 in the FIE Adjusted Official Rankings. The fencing team was officially named to the Olympic roster on June 29, 2016.

Gymnastics

Artistic
Poland has entered one artistic gymnast into the Olympic competition. This Olympic berth had been awarded to the Polish female gymnast, who participated in the apparatus and all-around events at the Olympic Test Event in Rio de Janeiro.

Women

Handball

Summary

Men's tournament

Poland men's handball team qualified for the Olympics by virtue of a top two finish at the first meet of the Olympic Qualification Tournament in Gdańsk.

Team roster

Group play

Quarterfinal

Semifinal

Bronze medal match

Judo

Poland has qualified a total of eight judokas for each of the following weight classes at the Games. Maciej Sarnacki, along with London 2012 Olympians Katarzyna Kłys and Daria Pogorzelec, were ranked among the top 22 eligible judokas for men and top 14 for women in the IJF World Ranking List of May 30, 2016, while Arleta Podolak at women's lightweight (57 kg) earned a continental quota spot from the European region as the highest-ranked Polish judoka outside of direct qualifying position.

Modern pentathlon

Poland has qualified a total of three modern pentathletes for the following events at the Games. Oktawia Nowacka and London 2012 Olympian Szymon Staśkiewicz secured their selection in the men's and women's event, respectively, by virtue of a top eight individual finish at the European Championships, while Anna Maliszewska was ranked among the top 10 modern pentathletes, not yet qualified, based on the UIPM World Rankings as of June 1, 2016.

Rowing

Poland has qualified a total of eight boats for each of the following rowing classes into the Olympic regatta. Six rowing crews had confirmed Olympic places for their boats at the 2015 FISA World Championships in Lac d'Aiguebelette, France, while rowers competing in men's eight and women's pair were further added to the Polish roster with their top four finish at the 2016 European & Final Qualification Regatta in Lucerne, Switzerland.

Men

Women

Qualification Legend: FA=Final A (medal); FB=Final B (non-medal); FC=Final C (non-medal); FD=Final D (non-medal); FE=Final E (non-medal); FF=Final F (non-medal); SA/B=Semifinals A/B; SC/D=Semifinals C/D; SE/F=Semifinals E/F; QF=Quarterfinals; R=Repechage

Sailing

Polish sailors have qualified one boat in each of the following classes through the 2014 ISAF Sailing World Championships, the individual fleet Worlds, and European qualifying regattas.

Men

Women

M = Medal race; EL = Eliminated – did not advance into the medal race

Shooting

Polish shooters have achieved quota places for the following events by virtue of their best finishes at the 2015 ISSF World Cup series, and the European Championships, as long as they obtained a minimum qualifying score (MQS) as of March 31, 2016. The entire shooting squad was named to the Polish roster on July 5, 2016, with rifle markswomen Agnieszka Nagay and London 2012 silver medalist Sylwia Bogacka returning for their fourth Olympics.

Qualification Legend: Q = Qualify for the next round; q = Qualify for the bronze medal (shotgun)

Swimming

Polish swimmers have so far achieved qualifying standards in the following events (up to a maximum of 2 swimmers in each event at the Olympic Qualifying Time (OQT), and potentially 1 at the Olympic Selection Time (OST)): To assure their selection to the Olympic team, swimmers must attain the Olympic qualifying cut in each of the individual events at the 2015 World Championships and at the 2016 Polish Championships & Olympic Trials in Szczecin (May 27 to 30).

Men

Women

Table tennis

Poland has fielded a team of six athletes into the table tennis competition at the Games. 2012 Olympian Li Qian secured one of ten available Olympic spots in the women's singles by winning the group final match at the European Qualification Tournament in Halmstad, Sweden. London 2012 Olympians Wang Zengyi and Katarzyna Grzybowska, along with Jakub Dyjas, were automatically selected among the top 22 eligible players in their respective singles events based on the ITTF Olympic Rankings.

Daniel Górak and Paralympian Natalia Partyka were each awarded the third spot to build the men's and women's teams for the Games by virtue of the top 10 national finish in the ITTF Olympic Rankings.

Men

Women

Taekwondo

Poland entered two athletes into the taekwondo competition at the Olympics. Piotr Paziński and 2015 European Games silver medalist Karol Robak secured spots in the men's lightweight (68 kg) and welterweight category (80 kg) respectively by virtue of their top two finish at the 2016 European Qualification Tournament in Istanbul, Turkey.

Tennis

Poland has entered seven tennis players (three men and four women) into the Olympic tournament. London 2012 Olympian Agnieszka Radwańska (world no. 3) qualified directly for the women's singles as one of the top 56 eligible players in the WTA World Rankings, while Jerzy Janowicz (world no. 120) had claimed one of six ITF Olympic men's singles places, as Poland's top-ranked tennis player outside of direct qualifying position in the ATP World Rankings as of June 6, 2016. Going to his fourth straight Games, Marcin Matkowski teamed up his new partner Łukasz Kubot to compete in the men's doubles, and were subsequently added to the Polish tennis team by virtue of their combined ATP ranking.

Due to the withdrawal of several tennis players from the Games, Magda Linette, along with Klaudia Jans-Ignacik and Paula Kania received spare ITF Olympic places to compete in the women's singles and doubles, respectively.

Men

Women

Mixed

Triathlon

Poland has entered one triathlete to compete at the Games. London 2012 Olympian Agnieszka Jerzyk was ranked among the top 40 eligible triathletes in the women's event based on the ITU Olympic Qualification List as of May 15, 2016.

Volleyball

Beach
Three Polish beach volleyball teams (two men's pairs and one women's pair) qualified directly for the Olympics by virtue of their nation's top 15 placement in the FIVB Olympic Rankings as of June 13, 2016.

Indoor

Men's tournament

Poland men's volleyball team qualified for the Olympics by virtue of a top three national finish at the first meet of the World Olympic Qualifying Tournament in Tokyo, Japan.

Team roster

Group play

Quarterfinal

Weightlifting

Polish weightlifters have qualified four men's quota places for the Rio Olympics based on their combined team standing by points at the 2014 and 2015 IWF World Championships. A single women's Olympic spot had been added to the Polish roster by virtue of a top six national finish at the 2016 European Championships. The team must allocate these places to individual athletes by June 20, 2016.

Wrestling

Poland has qualified a total of eight wrestlers for each of the following weight classes into the Olympic tournament.  Three of them had booked Olympic spots with their semifinal triumphs at the 2016 European Qualification Tournament. Meanwhile, the other half of the Polish roster had claimed the remaining Olympic slots in separate World Qualification Tournaments; two of them each in the men's freestyle 86 & 125 kg at the initial meet in Ulaanbaatar, and two more in the women's freestyle 48 & 63 kg at the final meet in Istanbul.

On May 11, 2016, United World Wrestling decided to revoke an Olympic license from Poland in men's freestyle 65 kg, due to doping violations at the European Qualification Tournament, but the license was reinstated two months later, following the recent meldonium guidelines released by IOC and WADA.

Men's freestyle

Women's freestyle

See also
Poland at the 2016 Summer Paralympics

References

External links 

 

Olympics
Nations at the 2016 Summer Olympics
2016